Keefer may refer to:

Charles Keefer (1852–1932) was one of Canada's pioneering engineers
Chester Keefer (1897–1972), American physician, medical researcher, and medical school dean
Don Keefer (1916–2014), American actor originally from Pennsylvania
Francis Henry Keefer (1860–1928), Canadian lawyer and politician
Janice Kulyk Keefer (born 1952), Canadian novelist and poet
John Keefer Mahony (1911–1990), Canadian recipient of the Victoria Cross
Keefer-Brubaker Farm (Oscar Fogle Farm), a historic home and farm complex located at Taneytown, Carroll County, Maryland, United States
Mel Keefer (1926–2022), American artist
Philip B. Keefer (1875–1949), United States Navy sailor and a recipient the Medal of Honor for his actions during the Spanish–American War
Thomas Keefer (1821–1915), Canadian civil engineer
Keefers, British Columbia, also known as Keefer's, a ghost town and former railway boomtown in British Columbia, Canada

See also
Kefir